Killygordon is a small village in the Finn Valley in the east of County Donegal in Ulster, the northern province in Ireland. , the population was 614. It is located on the N15 between Ballybofey and Castlefin. The separate hamlet and townland of Crossroads, usually known as The Cross, lies half a mile from Killygordon. The River Finn passes by the village  on its way towards its confluence with the River Mourne and the River Foyle.

Amenities
Killygordon has one pub, St. Patrick's Catholic church at the Crossroads, a Presbyterian church at Liscooley and St. Anne's Church of Ireland at Monellan.

Economy
The main employer in the area is Donegal Creameries Plc which is based in the nearby village of the Crossroads, a dairy company which supplies fresh milk to all of Donegal. As one of the largest employers in the county, it employs over 100 people and has been in operation since 1989. They sponsor most sports in Donegal including the GAA County team and the Finn Harps FC.

Places of interest
Monellan Castle, situated two miles outside the village, was built during the 18th century, and part of the 35 room dwelling was underground, to be used as a place of safety - if such was required. The castle and its gardens were in proper condition for some time after the Catholic Emancipation Act in 1775, until its demolition in the 1930s - on orders given to the Irish Land Commission from the Government of the day.

Demographics
The population of Greater Killygordon is just over six hundred people. The village and surrounding areas have a large Church of Ireland and Presbyterian minority, however, Roman Catholicism is the main religion practised.

Industry
Killygordon - Crossroads is home to some major companies including Donegal Creameries, McMenamin Engineering - a steel fabrication company and Mantis Cranes  - a crane rental and manufacturer.

Sport
The local Gaelic football team is Aodh Rua (Red Hugh's) and Setanta is the local hurling team. They have separate Gaelic Athletic Association (GAA) grounds and both are located at the Crossroads.

Curragh Athletic Football Club are the local football club, featuring teams from under-10 up to senior men's sides in Curragh Athletic grounds.

Finn Harps F.C. operate an underage academy and training facilities in Crossroads, at the former Curragh Athletic grounds. Three pitches are currently in use with underage boys and girls teams from under-11 up to under-19 making use of the facilities.

Education
Killygordon has two primary schools: Dromore National School and Killygordon National School. The Crossroads has one primary school, Gleneely National School.

The people of Killygordon get their secondary education either at the Finn Valley College (formally known as Stranorlar Vocational School), St. Columba's College Stranorlar or at the Royal and Prior, Raphoe.

Transport
Killygordon railway station opened in September 1863, but closed on 1 January 1960.

There is a bus service which connects Killygordon with Stranorlar and Strabane. 
From Stranorlar, there are routes to Letterkenny, Derry, Strabane, Dublin, Sligo and Galway.  In Strabane there are Ulsterbus services to Derry, Omagh, and Belfast.

Notable people
 Sir Jamie Flanagan, Chief Constable of the Royal Ulster Constabulary (RUC) from November 1973 to April 1976; born in Derry but raised near Killygordon.
 The 4th Viscount Lifford
 Hugh McLaughlin, publisher and inventor
 Donal Reid, All-Ireland winning footballer

See also
 List of populated places in the Republic of Ireland

References

External links
Finn Valley Online

Towns and villages in County Donegal